Haim Cohen (born 1960) is an Israeli chef.

Biography
Haim Cohen lives in Savyon with his wife, Sigal, and their three children.

Culinary and media career
Haim Cohen founded the former "Keren" restaurant, and went on to found restaurants such as "Yafo Tel Aviv" and "Dixie".

He was the host of Israel's first TV food show, . He has been a judge on all of MasterChef Israel's seasons. He is also a judge on Israel's My Kitchen Rules.

In 2020, he was hired by Microsoft to oversee dining in the Herzliya campus. He has helped rehabilitate released prisoners with a cookbook.

In 2021, students at Bezalel Academy of Art and Design were asked to design sets of kitchen utensils to be used by chefs for intimate dinners and private events. Cohen served as culinary mentor.

See also
Israeli cuisine

References 

Living people
Israeli television chefs
1960 births